Hajjiabad-e Shahlaei (also Romanized as Ḩājjīābād-e Shahlā’ī; also known as Ḩājjīābād) is a village in Mahidasht Rural District, Mahidasht District, Kermanshah County, Kermanshah Province, Iran. At the 2006 census, its population was 236, consisting of 50 families.

The name Shahlaei comes from the Shahlaei family which was one of the powerful of the region. Actually under the Qajar and Pahlavi Dynasties they were big landlords and senior officials.

References 

Populated places in Kermanshah County